"Clyde" is a song written by J. J. Cale, which first appeared on his 1972 album Naturally. American musical group Dr. Hook covered the song on their 1978 album Pleasure and Pain. The song was also successfully covered by American country music artist Waylon Jennings.

Released in April 1980, as the first single from Jennings' album Music Man, it reached #7 on the Billboard Hot Country Singles chart and #1 on the RPM Country Tracks chart in Canada.

Chart performance

References

1972 songs
1980 singles
Dr. Hook & the Medicine Show songs
Waylon Jennings songs
Songs written by J. J. Cale
RCA Records singles